Marius Sava (born 30 November 1978) is a Romanian former professional footballer who played as a midfielder or forward. Seen as the most talented midfielder of his generation Sava started his career at FC U Craiova, then played for important clubs in Romania such as: Progresul București, Argeș Pitești or Pandurii Târgu Jiu. Sava also had 2 short periods in Italy and Hungary at Genoa and Nyíregyháza Spartacus. He retired in 2009, at only 31 years old, after a season spent at Gaz Metan CFR Craiova, many people considering that he has never reached his true potential.

References

External links
 

1978 births
Living people
Sportspeople from Craiova
Romanian footballers
Association football midfielders
Association football forwards
Liga I players
FC U Craiova 1948 players
FC Progresul București players
FC Argeș Pitești players
CS Pandurii Târgu Jiu players
CS Turnu Severin players
Serie B players
Genoa C.F.C. players
Nemzeti Bajnokság I players
Nyíregyháza Spartacus FC players
Romanian expatriate footballers
Romanian expatriate sportspeople in Italy
Expatriate footballers in Italy
Romanian expatriate sportspeople in Hungary
Expatriate footballers in Hungary